The Dumaguete Presidencia is a historic building in Dumaguete, Philippines.

The Presidencia was built in 1937 with Juan Arellano as its architect. It is a mixture of indigenous Filipino, Spanish and neoclassical architecture. It used to serve as the city hall of Dumaguete.

It was later renovated and converted to a museum particularly as a branch of the National Museum of the Philippines (NMP). The NMP Museum opened on November 25, 2022, in a ceremony where a marker recognizing the building as an Important Cultural Property was also unveiled.

References

Buildings and structures completed in 1937
Buildings and structures in Dumaguete
Former seats of local government
City and municipal halls in the Philippines
Museums in the Philippines
Neoclassical architecture in the Philippines
20th-century architecture in the Philippines